David Conway may refer to:

David Conway (author) (born 1963), Irish author and musician
David Conway (music historian) (born 1950), British music historian
David Conway (philosopher) (born 1947), British academic philosopher